Note — many sporting events did not take place because of World War II

1945 in sports describes the year's events in world sport.

American football
NFL Championship: the Cleveland Rams won 15–14 over the Washington Redskins at Cleveland Stadium
 Army Cadets – college football national championship

Association football
England 
 With the end of World War II, the FA Cup is reinstated for the 1945–46 season; played on a two–legged basis. However, clubs are not yet prepared for a full league programme, so the Football League does not resume; regional leagues remain for another year.
France
 26 August: French Division 1 football is resumed for the first time since 1938–39.
Germany
 There is no major football in Germany due to World War II and the Allied occupation.
Portugal
 Primeira Liga won by S.L. Benfica.
Spain
 La Liga won by Barcelona.
Italy
 Serie A – not contested due to World War II.
Yugoslavia (Serbia)
Partizan Belgrade was founded in Humska area, Belgrade.
Red Star Belgrade was founded in Dedinje area, Belgrade on March 4.

Australian rules football
 Victorian Football League
 Carlton wins the 49th VFL Premiership defeating South Melbourne 15.13 (103) to 10.15 (75) in the Grand Final.
 South Australian National Football League:
 29 September: West Torrens win their third SANFL premiership, defeating Port Adelaide 15.25 (115) to 15.12 (102).
 Western Australian National Football League:
 29 March: After three seasons of football limited to players under 18 or 19, and a proposal to limit eligibility to players under 25, the WANFL decides to restore open-age league football.
 13 October: East Fremantle 12.15 (87) defeat South Fremantle 7.9 (51) for their nineteenth senior WANFL premiership.

Baseball
 World Series – Detroit Tigers defeat the Chicago Cubs, 4 games to 3.
 Negro World Series – Cleveland Buckeyes swept the Homestead Grays, 4 games to 0.
 A professional baseball league, Tokyo Senators was founded in Japan on November 6, as predecessor of Hokkaido Nippon-Ham Fighters.

Basketball
NBL Championship
Fort Wayne Zollner Pistons win three games to two over the Sheboygan Redskins
Events
 The twelfth South American Basketball Championship in Guayaquil is won by Brazil.
Italy
Pallacanestro Varese was founded in Lombardy Region.
Serbia
KK Crvena zvezda, as known well for professional basketball club of Serbia, officially founded on March 3.

Cricket
England
With the end of World War II in Europe, a small number of first-class matches are played for the first time since 1939, but it is not practicable to resume the County Championship or the Minor Counties Championship.
Most runs – Len Hutton 782 @ 48.87 (HS 188)
Most wickets – Dick Pollard 28 @ 24.25 (BB 6–75)
Australia
 23 November – With the lifting of bans on weekday sport at the end of World War II, first-class cricket is played in Australia for the first time since 1 December 1941. The Sheffield Shield, however, is not contested until the following season.
India
 4–8 March: Cottari Subbanna Nayudu of Holkar sets two first-class records in the Ranji Trophy final against Bombay, bowling 912 balls and conceding 428 runs in the match.
 Ranji Trophy – Bombay beat Holkar by 374 runs
 Bombay Pentangular – Hindus
New Zealand
 24 December: The Plunket Shield is resumed after having not been contested, despite a small number of interprovincial first-class matches, since 1939–40.
South Africa
 15 December: With the end of World War II, first-class cricket is played in South Africa for the first time since 14 March 1943, though the last regular interprovincial matches had been in 1939–40.

Cycling
Tour de France
 not contested due to World War II
Giro d'Italia
 not contested due to World War II

Figure skating
World Figure Skating Championships
 not contested due to World War II

Golf
Men's professional
 Masters Tournament – not played due to World War II
 U.S. Open – not played due to World War II
 British Open – not played due to World War II
 PGA Championship – Byron Nelson
 PGA Tour money leader – Byron Nelson – $63,336
Men's amateur
 British Amateur – not played due to World War II
 U.S. Amateur – not played due to World War II
Women's professional
 Women's Western Open – Babe Zaharias
 Titleholders Championship – not played due to World War II

Horse racing
Steeplechases
 Cheltenham Gold Cup – Red Rower
 Grand National – not held due to World War II
Hurdle races
 Champion Hurdle – Brains Trust
Flat races
 Australia – Melbourne Cup won by Rainbird
 Canada – King's Plate won by Uttermost
 France – Prix de l'Arc de Triomphe won by Nikellora
 Ireland – Irish Derby Stakes won by Piccadilly
 English Triple Crown Races:
 2,000 Guineas Stakes – Court Martial
 The Derby – Dante
 St. Leger Stakes – Chamossaire
 United States Triple Crown Races:
 Kentucky Derby – Hoop Jr.
 Preakness Stakes – Polynesian
 Belmont Stakes – Pavot

Ice hockey
 Stanley Cup: Toronto Maple Leafs beat Detroit Red Wings four games to three.

Motor racing
 Indianapolis 500 – not held due to World War II
 9 September – The first European Grand Prix since 1939 is held in Paris, being won by Jean-Pierre Wimille.

Rowing
The Boat Race
 Oxford and Cambridge Boat Race is not contested due to World War II

Rugby league
1945–46 European Rugby League Championship
1945 New Zealand rugby league season
1945 NSWRFL season
1944–45 Northern Rugby Football League Wartime Emergency League season / 1945–46 Northern Rugby Football League season

Rugby union
 Five Nations Championship series is not contested due to World War II

Speed skating
Speed Skating World Championships
 not contested due to World War II

Tennis
Australia
 Australian Men's Singles Championship – not contested
 Australian Women's Singles Championship – not contested
England
 Wimbledon Men's Singles Championship – not contested
 Wimbledon Women's Singles Championship – not contested
France
 French Men's Singles Championship – Yvon Petra (France) defeats Bernard Destremau (France) 7–5, 6–4, 6–2
 French Women's Singles Championship – Lolette Payot (Switzerland) defeats Simone Iribarne Lafargue (France) 6–3, 6–4
USA
 American Men's Singles Championship – Frank Parker (USA) defeats Bill Talbert (USA) 14–12, 6–1, 6–2
 American Women's Singles Championship – Sarah Palfrey Cooke (USA) defeats Pauline Betz Addie (USA) 3–6, 8–6, 6–4
Davis Cup
 1945 International Lawn Tennis Challenge – not contested

References

 
Sports by year